Bolandu or Bolandoo may refer to:
 Bolandu, Fars
 Bolandu, Hormozgan